Ob Bay may refer to:
 Gulf of Ob in Russian Arctics
 Ob' Bay in Antarctics